L. Banks Holt House is a historic home located near Alamance, Alamance County, North Carolina. It was built in the 1870s, and consists of a two-story main block, two-story ell, and one-story hip-roofed wing in a vernacular Italianate style. Parts of the house may date to the late 18th or early 19th century. Also on the property is the Holt family cemetery.

The house now serves as the Alamance County Historical Museum.

It was added to the National Register of Historic Places in 1977.

References

External links
 Alamance County Historical Museum website

Houses on the National Register of Historic Places in North Carolina
Cemeteries on the National Register of Historic Places in North Carolina
Italianate architecture in North Carolina
Houses completed in 1875
Houses in Alamance County, North Carolina
Museums in Alamance County, North Carolina
National Register of Historic Places in Alamance County, North Carolina